Qeshlaq-e Hajji Savad (also Romanized as Qeshlāq-e Ḩājj Savād; also known as Qeshlāq-e Mehdī Khān) is a village in Qeshlaq-e Sharqi Rural District, Qeshlaq Dasht District, Bileh Savar County, Ardabil Province, Iran. At the 2006 census, its population was 93, in 21 families.

References 

Towns and villages in Bileh Savar County